This is a list of members of the Australian Senate from 1 July 2005 to 30 June 2008. Half of the state senators had been elected at the November 2001 election and had terms due to finish on 30 June 2008; the other half of the state senators were elected at the October 2004 election and had terms due to finish on 30 June 2011. The territory senators were elected at the October 2004 election and their terms ended at the next federal election, which was November 2007. The new Senate first met in August 2005, with state senators elected in 2004 sworn in on 9 August 2005.

This election was the beginning of the end for the Australian Democrats, in that while they still had 4 senators from the 2001 election, they failed to win a single senate seat at the 2004 election and have not won a senate seat since.

Notes

References

Members of Australian parliaments by term
21st-century Australian politicians
Australian Senate lists